Adrana may refer to:
 Adrana, Jhelum, a village in Pakistan
 Adrana (bivalve), a genus of bivalves in the family Nuculanidae
 Adrana, a genus of butterflies in the family Noctuidae, synonym of Paectes